Soundbombing is a hip hop compilation album by Rawkus Records, released on October 14, 1997. The album helped launch the careers of Mos Def and Reflection Eternal (Talib Kweli and Hi-Tek), who later became Rawkus's most popular artists. Soundbombing is regarded as a "scene-defining" underground hip hop album.

Background
After the critical success of Company Flow's Funcrusher Plus album, released a few months prior, Rawkus returned with a compilation that showcased their growing roster. Mixed by DJ Evil Dee of Da Beatminerz, the album is sequenced like a mixtape, staying true to the label's underground roots. The album is mainly composed of 12" singles previously released by the label in 1997. It is subtitled "The Ultimate Guide to Underground Hip-Hop Mixed by Evil Dee".

Critical reception

Soundbombing received mostly positive reviews from music critics. Charles Aaron of Spin noted that "you can hear the hints of a Native Tongues-like posse feeding off of one another's smarts and enthusiasm, unworried about recreating 1988's magic or being welcomed into rap's gated fantasyland." In his consumer guide for The Village Voice, Robert Christgau gave the album an A− rating and stated, "this singles-plus showcase is 'underground' hip hop's most convincing advertisement for itself", also praising the performances of Mos Def, Talib Kweli and R.A. the Rugged Man.

Writing for AllMusic, Nathan Rabin believed that the album "arrived at a crucial juncture for rap music, just as the deaths of 2Pac and Notorious B.I.G. forced hip-hop to re-examine its priorities, and the commercial dominance of Bad Boy necessitated a smart, socially conscious alternative to P. Diddy's blatantly commercial brand of karaoke hip-pop." Dana Scott of Ambrosia for Heads wrote that the album "was Hip-Hop seeking refuge to return to the culture's days of innocence. It worked, signaling a rebirth that spawned a new breed of MC legends—and a subsequent series that Heads could trust." In the 5th edition of his Encyclopedia of Popular Music, Colin Larkin hailed it as a "scene-defining" underground hip hop album.

Track listing

References 

1997 compilation albums
Albums produced by DJ Spinna
Albums produced by El-P
Albums produced by Hi-Tek
Hip hop compilation albums
Rawkus Records compilation albums